Diocese of Ban Mê Thuột is a Roman Catholic diocese of Vietnam in the city of Buôn Ma Thuột (f.k.a. Ban Mê Thuột) in Đắk Lắk Province of the Central Highlands region. Joseph Nguyễn Tích Đức retired as bishop in 2007, and died as Bishop Emeritus on Monday, 23 May 2011, aged 73.

The Diocese of Ban Mê Thuôt was erected on 22 June 1967 by Pope Paul VI with territory from the dioceses of Đà Lạt and Kontum. It is a suffragan diocese of the Archdiocese of Huế. More than 10% of the two million people living in its area are Roman Catholics. Many of them belong to ethnic minorities.

External links
Diocese of Ban Mê Thuôt

Buon Ma Thuot
Ban Me Thuot
Christian organizations established in 1967
Roman Catholic dioceses and prelatures established in the 20th century
Ban Me Thuot, Roman Catholic Diocese of
1967 establishments in South Vietnam